Ozan Göksu Yanar (born 3 May 1987 in Istanbul, Turkey) is a Finnish politician and a former Member of the Finnish Parliament, representing the Green League. He has been the chairman of Federation of Green Youth and Students since 2015.

Yanar was elected to the Parliament in the 2015 election, with 4,196 votes. He took part in the 2019 election, but was not re-elected.

References

1987 births
Living people
Politicians from Istanbul
Finnish people of Turkish descent
Green League politicians
Members of the Parliament of Finland (2015–19)
Articles containing video clips